Yuzhnaya is a station on the Serpukhovsko-Timiryazevskaya Line of the Moscow Metro. It was designed by V. A. Cheremin and R. Bazhenov and opened in 1983.

References

Moscow Metro stations
Serpukhovsko-Timiryazevskaya Line
Railway stations in Russia opened in 1983
Railway stations located underground in Russia